The Allahabad pillar is a stambha, containing one of the pillar edicts of Ashoka, possibly erected by Ashoka, emperor of the Maurya dynasty, who reigned in the 3rd century BCE, or it may have prior origins. While it is one of the few extant pillars that carry Ashokan  edicts, it is particularly notable for containing later inscriptions attributed to the Gupta emperor Samudragupta (4th century CE). Also engraved on the stone are inscriptions by the Mughal emperor Jahangir, from the 17th century.

According to some scholars, the pillar was moved from its original location and installed within Akbar's Allahabad Fort in Allahabad, Uttar Pradesh by Emperor Akbar himself, but this theory is disputed by other scholars who point out the absence of any confirmatory evidence that the pillar was moved, and pre-Mughal inscriptions that indicate that it was already present in its current location. As the fort is now occupied by the Indian Army, the public are only allowed limited access to the premises and special permission is required to view the pillar.

History

The customary lotiform bell-shaped capital seen in the other Ashoka Pillars is lost, as is whichever statue mounted it. However the abacus, adorned by a "graceful scroll of alternate lotus and honeysuckle" that the statue must have rested upon, was found nearby. Cunningham believed that the capital must have been mounted by a single lion. The abacus is almost identical to the one found on the pillar at Sankasya suggesting proximate erection dates.

Ashokan pillar from Kaushambi
According to the theory proposed by 19th-century archaeologists, and supported by Indian scholars such as Upinder Singh, the Allahabad pillar came from somewhere else, probably Kaushambi. The Ashokan inscriptions suggest that the pillar was first erected at Kaushambi, an ancient town some 30 miles (50 kilometers) west of its current location which was then the capital of the kingdom of Vatsa. It was moved to Allahabad much later when the region came under Muslim rule. The presence of another broken pillar at Kaushambi near the ruins of the Ghoshitarama  monastery has led some to believe that the Allahabad Pillar might have been one of a pair, not unlike the ones discovered at Rampurva.

The pillar has been taken down and re-erected a number of times since the 13th century. It was once re-erected during the time of Jahangir in 1605, albeit crowned by a globe surmounted by a cone, and was later sketched by the Jesuit missionary, Joseph Tiefenthaler, in the mid-18th century. General Kyd pulled the pillar down in 1798. In 1838, Captain Edward Smith "of the Engineers" set up the pillar once again, this time with a new lion capital of his own design. Cunningham criticized this effort at restoration as "a signal failure" as he thought the statue was "small and recumbent". He summed up the design with the following remark,

Ashokan pillar, in situ
An alternate theory proposed by Krishnaswamy and Ghosh in 1935 states that the Allahabad pillar was never moved. They dismissed the theory that Muslim Sultans, anyone from the Mughal empire, Hindu kings before the arrival of Islam, or any private individual may have moved the pillar from Kaushambi to the current location. Their arguments are based on the dates of the numerous inscriptions on the pillar, the lack of textual evidence in any historical texts, or of a reason for anyone to move the pillar from Kaushambi to Allahabad, since there is no evidence that these were significant cities. They also dismiss the possibility that a private individual may have moved it because the pillar is too big and heavy, and required a very large amount of resources to move it. Ashoka may have installed it at Prayag because the confluence of Ganges and Yamuna rivers was already a major pilgrimage site during his time, thus a location that gave more access and visibility to his edicts. The Ashokan inscription is merely a copy of the Kausambi inscription, state Krishnaswamy and Ghosh. The surface damage and the addition of numerous new inscriptions happened while the pillar stood in Allahabad.

Pre-Ashokan, Prayāga bull-pillar
A third theory was proposed in 1979 by John Irwin, who concurred with Krishnaswamy and Ghosh that the Allahabad pillar was never moved and was always at the confluence of the rivers Ganges and Yamuna. He further stated that the pillar's origins were undoubtedly pre-Ashokan based on all the evidence at the site, the major and minor inscriptions as well as textual evidence, taken together. According to Irwin, an analysis of the minor inscriptions and ancient scribblings on the pillar first observed by Cunningham, also noted by Krishnaswamy and Ghosh, reveals that these included years and months, and the latter "always turns out to be Magha, which also gives it name to the Magh Mela", the bathing pilgrimage festival of the Hindus.

Archaeological and geological surveys done since the 1950s, states Irwin, have revealed that the rivers – particularly Ganges – have a different course now than in distant past. The original path of river Ganges had settlements dating from 8th-century BCE onwards. This ancient path of the river placed the pillar more directly on the banks of the confluence. Further, east from the pillar is the remains of an ancient massive well (samudra-kup in early Sanskrit texts), in the direction of the remains of Pratisthan (now Jhusi). The Vasuki temple and Alarkapuri, which pilgrims visit after ritual bathing as a part of their traditional parikrama (circumambulation, Magha Mela walking circuit), are also ancient and consistent with early Sanskrit texts. According to Irwin, the pillar itself is pre-Buddhist, to which Ashoka added the Brahmi script inscription to advertise his edicts to the masses of pilgrims and the extant Buddhist monasteries there. He adds, "we also know with certainty that its original emblem had been – not a lion, as previously supposed – but the bull of pre-Buddhist, Brahmanical religion".

According to Karel Werner – an Indologist known for his studies on religion particularly Buddhism, Irwin work "showed conclusively that the pillar did not originate at Kaushambi", but had been at Prayaga from pre-Buddhist time as a center of a very ancient pillar cult and that in fact, this was incorrectly attributed to Ashoka.

Inscriptions
He remarked,

There are three sets of inscriptions on the column from the three emperors, Ashoka Maurya, Samudragupta and Jahangir. They are accompanied by some minor inscriptions by pilgrims and others, which were derided as a mass of modern scribblings by Alexander Cunningham. Some of these are, however, dated and coupled with the style of scripts used, are useful to establish the periods when the pillar was in an erect position, and when it was lying prone on the ground.

Ashoka inscriptions

The Ashokan inscriptions on the Allahabad Pillar (along with inscriptions elsewhere) were pivotal to the decipherment of the Brahmi script by The Asiatic Society's James Prinsep. It led to the rediscovery of the Mauryan emperor and the unearthing of the full extent of his empire.

The inscription is engraved in continuous lines around the column in Brahmi and contains the same six edicts that can be seen on the other pillars. The surviving inscriptions from the Ashoka period are "uniform in size, neat and deeply engraved" observed Cunningham.

Major Pillar Edicts 1-6
The pillar contains the Major Pillar Edicts of Ashoka, from 1 to 6. The first and second edicts have survived in full. However, much of the third and fourth edicts were "ruthlessly destroyed by the cutting of the vain-glorious inscription of Jahangir, recording the names of his ancestors". Only two lines of the fifth edict have survived, the others lost by surface peel off. The sixth is almost complete, with a loss of about half a line. These edits are the same as found at other Ashokan pillars. Besides the six edicts, the Allahabad pillar also includes what are known as the Schism edict, the Queen's edict and the Birbal Magha Mela inscription.

Schism edict

The Schism Edict, referred to as the Kaushambi edict by Cunningham, is a command from the emperor addressing the senior officials (Mahamatras) of Kaushambi urging them to avoid dissension and stay united. The following is a conflation of various fragmented versions of the edict:

Queen's edict

The Queen's Edict refers to the charitable deeds of Ashoka's queen, Karuvaki, the mother of Prince Tivala.

Samudragupta inscription
A later inscription, also known as the Prayag Prashasti, is attributed to the 4th century CE Gupta emperor Samudragupta, and follows immediately below the edicts of Ashoka. It is considered "the most important historical document of the classical Gupta age". It is in excellent Sanskrit, written in the more refined Gupta script (a later version of Brahmi) by the poet and minister, Harishena. The inscription is a panegyric praising Samudragupta and lists the political and military achievements of his reign including his expeditions to the south. It provides a unique snapshot of the Gupta empire and its neighbours and is the source of much of what is known of the geopolitical landscape of that era.

The following is from the translation of the inscription by D. R. Bhandarkar:

Earlier translations, including one by J. F. Fleet, also exist.

Birbal Magh Mela inscription
The Birbal Magh Mela inscription is from the second half of the 16th century.

This inscription is significant because it confirms that Prayag was a significant pilgrimage center – Tirth Raj – for the Hindus in the 16th century, and that the festival was held in the month of Magha. The Samvat year 1632 is equivalent to 1575 CE, while Saka 1493 equals 1571 CE. One of these is a scribal error, but the decade is accurate because Allahabad was under Akbar's control at the time and where built a major fort. Historical documents also confirm that Birbal did visit Akbar and Allahabad often.

Cunningham noted that many smaller inscriptions were added on the pillar over time. Quite many of these inscriptions include a date between 1319 CE and 1397 CE, and most of these include the month Magha. According to Krishnaswamy and Ghosh, these dates are likely related to the Magh Mela pilgrimage at Prayag, as recommended in the ancient Hindu texts.

Jahangir inscription

A still later inscription in Persian traces the ancestry of the Mughal emperor Jahangir. It was carved by Mir Abdullah Mushkin Qalam, shortly before his accession to the throne when he was still Shah Salim. The Jahangir inscription overwrote and "ruthlessly destroyed" the significant portion of the ancient Ashoka inscription, states Cunningham.

See also

 Early Indian epigraphy
 Prashasti
 Kahaum pillar

References

Further reading
 
 
 
 
 
 
 
 
 
 
 
 

Monumental columns in India
Indian inscriptions
History of Uttar Pradesh
Buildings and structures in Allahabad
Mauryan art
Gupta Empire
4th century in India
Gupta and post-Gupta inscriptions
Mughal Empire
Memorials to Ashoka